KPJC may refer to:

 KPJC-LD, a low-power television station (channel 11, virtual 24) licensed to serve San Francisco, California, United States
 KSLM (AM), a radio station (1220 AM) licensed to serve Salem, Oregon, United States, which held the call sign KPJC from 2007 to 2018
 KZHN, a radio station (1250 AM) licensed to serve Paris, Texas, United States, which held the call sign KPJC from 1999 to 2005